Demon Theory  is a novel written by Native American author Stephen Graham Jones. Written like a screenplay, it was published in 2006.

Motifs

The novel/screenplay explores a long list of normal and bizarre subject matters, including demons, angels, gargoyles, familial dysfunction, guilt, trust, and sanity.

Novels by Stephen Graham Jones
2006 American novels
Native American novels
MacAdam/Cage books